Peng Sanyuan, born Peng Mingyan, is a Chinese female film director, a writer from mainland China, a screenwriter of film and television works, and a member of the China Writers Association.

Biography

Early life and education

As a child born in the countryside, Peng Sanyuan's family was poor. Her mother had to go over the mountains to relatives' homes to "borrow food". Peng's childhood did not reveal her talent for writing, and she did not receive a prize from the school for writing a runaway essay in a joint examination. After that, she wrote her first essay "My Mother in the North".

Peng Sanyuan graduated from the Department of Educational Psychology, Capital Normal University in 1992. In 2002, she graduated from the director training class of Beijing Film Academy.

Writing 
Peng is the author of a collection of essays Bitter Water Roses (Sichuan Literature and Art Publishing House, 1996) and the novel Beijing Life (Writers Publishing House, 1996). In August 2000, Peng cooperated with Wong Liankwai on This is family life (Chinese:今生是亲人, 2000).

Career 
After Peng graduated from the director training class of Beijing Film Academy, she was assigned to teach in a middle school with her main occupation and her secondary occupation being writing.

In March 2011, she signed a contract with Huayi Brothers and set up her own film production studio, officially becoming a film and television producer.

Film and television work 
In 1999, her screenwriting and producing credits include TV series I'm a Relative in This Life. In 2000, she was the scriptwriter of the period romance Nine Nine Return to One (2000), which tells the life of a pair of half-brothers who walk with the century, one master and one servant, through a century of changes and sorrow. In 2001, she co-wrote the screenplay for the urban romance Urban Beauty (2001), directed by Li Jiaqi. And in 2002, Peng wrote the screenplay for the TV series Back of the Palm, which co-starred Zhuang Xin, Fang Bin and Liu Chang. In the same year, She wrote the screenplay for the plot film Bonus, directed by He Jianjun.

In 2004, he was the scriptwriter of the urban romantic drama Blue Bird Sky, which is about the seemingly mundane emotional entanglements between several young men and women in a modern city. In the same year, she was the scriptwriter of the TV series "Begonia Still "(2016),  which was based on the book "My Uncle Zhou Enlai" written by Zhou Bingde. In 2005, she was the scriptwriter of the family drama Halfway Couples (2004), directed by Liu Huining, for which she was shortlisted for the Best Screenplay Award at the 13th Shanghai TV Festival. In 2006, she was the scriptwriter of the urban emotional drama Close to You & Make Me Warm (2006), which is about three women in an abnormal emotional state, how they step by step get out of their psychological difficulties, find their emotions again and transcend themselves. On December 18, 2006, she was the scriptwriter of the military suspense spy drama "The Guest on the Iceberg" (Chinese: 冰山上的来客，2006), which was adapted from the 1963 film of the same name.

On March 1, 2007, she co-wrote the drama Brothers  (2007), starring Zhang Guo and Chen Jianbin. In 2009, she co-wrote the drama "You'll Never Walk Alone" (Chinese:你永远不会孤行, 2009), starring Zhao Ziqi, Liu Yun and Niu Qingfeng. In 2010, on October 19, she co-wrote the drama "You Are My Brother" (Chinese:你是我兄弟, 2009), directed by Liu Huining.

On December 11, 2011, she was the scriptwriter of the family drama "People to Forty" (Chinese:人到四十, 2011), directed by Pang Hao. On July 23, 2012, she was the producer of the school youth drama "Youth Code" (Chinese:青春守则, 2012), which started production in Xiamen. In the same year, she was the scriptwriter of the urban police drama "No Thief" (Chinese:无贼, 2012) with Geng Xuhong and Zhu Yan, which tells the story of a tangled couple of thieves and the family of the police station chief. In 2014, she was the scriptwriter of the love family drama "Love in the Left and Right Hand" (Chinese: 左手亲情右手爱, 2014), which tells the story of two families in the 1970s and their "misplaced" emotions for more than 30 years.

After learning about the large numbers of missing children lost to human trafficking in China, she wrote and directed her first film Lost and Love (Lost Orphan in the original Chinese title) a Mandarin-language film produced by Huayi Brothers. The film starred award-winning Hong Kong actor Andy Lau and portrayed a farmer's search for his missing son. Sandra Ng had a cameo appearance as a child trafficker. The film was based on the story of Guo Gangtang, a farmer in Shandong province who traveled 400,000 kilometers across China to look for his son. It was released in China on March 20, 2015. Her novel Lost Orphans was also published in March 2015. The film won the 16th Huabiao Award for Outstanding Film, and she received the Best Screenplay Award at the 13th Changchun Film Festival.

In 2017, she served as a screenwriter for the urban emotional drama "The Many Years You're Late" (Chinese:你迟到的许多年, 2017), which was adapted from Yan Geling's novel "Mending Jade Mountain House", for which she was shortlisted for the Best Screenplay (Adaptation) Award at the 25th Shanghai TV Festival - White Magnolia Awards.

In August 2020, she was the director and scriptwriter of the unit "My Name is Dalian" (Chinese:我叫大连, 2020) in the anti-epidemic drama "Together" (Chinese:在一起, 2020).

Filmography

Awards and nominations

References

External links 
 
 
 

Chinese film directors
Chinese women film directors
Year of birth missing (living people)
Living people